Francesco Donati (born 20 January 2001) is an Italian professional footballer who plays as a right-back for  club Ascoli, on loan from Empoli.

Club career
Donati was raised in the Empoli youth teams and began receiving call-ups to the senior squad in the 2019–20 season, remaining on the bench on those occasions.

On 22 July 2021, Donati joined Juve Stabia in Serie C on a season-long loan.

On 12 July 2022, Donati moved on a new loan to the Serie B club Ascoli. He made his Serie B debut for Ascoli on 14 August 2022 in a game against Ternana.

References

External links
 

2001 births
Sportspeople from Livorno
Living people
Italian footballers
Association football defenders
Empoli F.C. players
S.S. Juve Stabia players
Ascoli Calcio 1898 F.C. players
Serie C players
Serie B players